Catherine Fautrier-Rousseau is a Monegasque diplomat and politician who has served as an Ambassador of Monaco to Spain since 2020.  Fautrier previously served as Ambassador to China and Australia.

Education
 1992, University Master Degree in International Affairs – ESC Clermont-Ferrand.
 1991, Bachelor and Degree in International Affairs – ESCE Paris.
 1988, Baccalaureat in economy, Lycée Albert 1er Monaco.

References

Living people
Monegasque women ambassadors
Monegasque politicians
Year of birth missing (living people)
Ambassadors of Monaco to Spain
Ambassadors of Monaco to China
Ambassadors of Monaco to Australia